Vivian Fowler may refer to:

Vivian Fowler Elementary, part of the Mount Pleasant Independent School District, in Mount Pleasant, Texas
Vivian Fowler Memorial College for Girls, in Lagos, Nigeria